Ratnagiri District (Marathi pronunciation: [ɾət̪n̪aːɡiɾiː]) is a district in the state of Maharashtra, India. The administrative headquarter of the district is located in the town of Ratnagiri. The district is 11.33% urban. The district is bounded by the Arabian Sea to the west, Sindhudurg district to the south, Raigad district to the north and Satara, Sangli and Kolhapur districts to the east. This district is part of Konkan division.

Officer

Members of Parliament

Sunil Tatkare (NCP) - Raigad
Vinayak Raut (SHS (UBT))

Guardian Minister

list of Guardian Minister

District Magistrate/Collector

list of District Magistrate / Collector

History
From pre-Christian times until 1312, the area - like the entire region - was ruled by various Buddhist and Hindu rulers. The first state known by name was the Maurya Empire, the last non-Muslim dynasty were the Yadavas of Devagiri. After decades of military clashes with Muslim rulers in northern India, it was occupied by Muslim armies between 1312 and 1470. From 1500 on there was fierce fighting for rule on the coast between the Muslim rulers and the Portuguese. After that, various Muslim dynasties ruled until 1658 (Sultanate of Delhi, Bahmani, Deccan Sultanates and the Mughals).From 1658  most of the area became part of the Maratha Empire. After the defeat of the Marathas against the British in 1818, Ratnagiri area became an administrative region of the Bombay Presidency. With the independence of India in 1947 and the reorganization of the country, it became part of the new state of Bombay State in 1950. In 1948 the district grew through the incorporation of the Sawantwadi princely state. In 1960, Bombay State was divided and the area became part of the newly created state of Maharashtra. In 1981 the district was divided and the southern part of the district became Sindhudurg district.

Geography 

An outstanding feature of the geography of the district is its uneven or hill topography, with about 45% of the district being characterized as 'hilly'. Very narrow riverine plains fringe the coastline.

Demographics 

According to the 2011 census Ratnagiri district has a population of 1,615,069, roughly equal to the nation of Guinea-Bissau or the US state of Idaho. This gives it a ranking of 311th in India (out of a total of 640). Its population growth rate over the decade 2001-2011 was -4.96%. Ratnagiri has a sex ratio of 1123 females for every 1000 males, and a literacy rate of 82.43%. 16.33% of the population lived in urban areas. Scheduled Castes and Scheduled Tribes make up 4.15% and 1.26% of the population respectively.

At the time of the 2011 Census of India, 88.18% of the population in the district spoke Marathi, 7.36% Urdu, 1.43% Hindi and 0.97% Konkani as their first language. Most people speak distinct coastal dialects of Marathi.

Towns and villages 
 

Jalgaon, Ratnagiri
Kule, Sangameshwar
Satawali (census town)
Waghivane

See also 
Malvani people
Sangameshwari

Notable people
Notable people from Ratnagiri include:

Lokmanya Tilak
 Balasaheb Kher
 Dhondo Keshav Karve
 Vinoba Bhave
 Pandurang Vaman Kane
 Swatantryaveer Savarkar was moved to Ratnagiri with his freedom of movement restricted to the boundary of the district and also refraining from politics.
 Govind Sakharam Sardesai
R. P. Paranjpye
Shakuntala Paranjpye
Gopal Krishna Gokhale
Rani Lakshmi Bai
Madhu Dandavate
 Sadhana Sargam
 Sadha

References

External links

Ratnagiri district official website
Sahyadri Nisarga Mitra - NGO working on nature conservation

 
1832 establishments in India
Districts of Maharashtra
Konkan division